Porterville College is a public community college in Porterville, California. It was established in 1927.

Notable alumni and faculty
 Wayne Hardin (1926-2017) – College Football Hall of Famer, former head football coach at Porterville College 1952 and 1953

References

External links
 

California Community Colleges
Educational institutions established in 1927
Schools accredited by the Western Association of Schools and Colleges
Porterville, California
1927 establishments in California